The position-sensing feature in the position-sensing cylinder provides instantaneous analog or digital electronic position feedback information from the cylinder that indicates the amount of rod extension throughout the range of stroke.

"Smart" hydraulic cylinders

Internal LDT
In-cylinder Linear Displacement Transducers (LDTs) are used in mobile equipment. A limitation to most in-cylinder LDTs is that the hydraulic cylinder’s piston rod must be bored through its center to accommodate certain elements of the LDT — usually the waveguide tube of a magnetostrictive transducer. The machining and additional production steps associated with “gun drilling” the piston rod can add cost to the finished cylinder. And although magnetostrictive LDTs provide extremely high accuracy, this accuracy usually is much greater than is needed for most mobile equipment applications.

Installing linear position sensors into hydraulic cylinders complicates the production process. CPI has developed a system of sensors which can eliminate the need for gun drilling.

External LDT
External linear displacement transducers (LDTs) eliminate the need for a hollow hydraulic cylinder rod.  Instead, an external sensing “bar” utilizing Hall-Effect technology senses the position of the hydraulic cylinder piston. This is accomplished by the placement of a permanent magnet within the piston.  The magnet propagates a magnetic field through the steel wall of the hydraulic cylinder, providing a locating signal to the sensor. 

Advantages of External LDT:

 Full rod buckling strength is maintained
 The cylinder is easier to assemble, install, and service
 A wide variety of sensor inputs and outputs are available
 The permanent magnet in the piston should never need to be replaced
 The external sensor is readily accessible and easy to replace, if necessary
 If the sensing bar is replaced, re-calibration is not necessary
 The sensing bar is small, and its location along the outside of the hydraulic cylinder wall minimizes the potential for environmental damage
 Positioning accuracy is +/- .5mm or better;  more than adequate for most mobile equipment
 There are no cables or wires used, and hence no concerns regarding stretching or breakage due to ice, plant limbs, or other environmental obstructions
 Should machine power be lost and then recovered, the sensor will send the current position

References

External links
High Beam Article
Hydraulic Cylinders
Hydraulic Piping Systems

Hydraulic actuators